Sarmast is a city and capital of Govar District, in Gilan-e Gharb County, Kermanshah Province, Iran.  At the 2006 census, its population was 2,434, in 515 families. The city is populated by Kurds and is situated close to Ghalajeh tunnel.

See also
Kalhor
Ghalajeh Protected Area

References

Populated places in Gilan-e Gharb County

Cities in Kermanshah Province
Kurdish settlements in Kermanshah Province